"Nkosi Sikelel' iAfrika" is a Christian hymn originally composed in 1897 by Enoch Sontonga, a Xhosa clergyman at a Methodist mission school near Johannesburg.

The song became a pan-African liberation song and versions of it were later adopted as the national anthems of five countries in Africa including Zambia, Tanzania, Namibia and Zimbabwe after independence, and South Africa after the end of apartheid. The song's melody is still used as the national anthem of Tanzania and the national anthem of Zambia (Zimbabwe and Namibia have since changed to new anthems with original melody composition).

In 1994, Nelson Mandela decreed that the verse of Nkosi Sikelel' iAfrika be embraced as a joint national anthem of South Africa; a revised version additionally including elements of "Die Stem" (the then co-state anthem inherited from the previous apartheid government) was adopted in 1997. This new South African national anthem is  sometimes referred to as "Nkosi Sikelel' iAfrika" although it is not its official name.

The hymn is also often considered the unofficial African "national" anthem. According to anthropologist David Coplan: "'Nkosi Sikelel' iAfrika' has come to symbolize more than any other piece of expressive culture the struggle for African unity and liberation in South Africa."

History 

"Nkosi Sikelel' iAfrika" was originally composed as a hymn in 1897 by Enoch Sontonga, a teacher at a Methodist mission school near Johannesburg. Some claim the melody is based on the hymn "Aberystwyth" by Joseph Parry,
though others have called the connection far fetched. The words of the first stanza and chorus were originally written in Xhosa as a hymn. In 1927 seven additional Xhosa stanzas were added by the poet Samuel Mqhayi. Sontonga originally composed the hymn in B-flat major with a four-part harmony supporting a repetitive melody characteristic of "both Western hymn composition and indigenous South African melodies." The hymn was taken up by the choir of Ohlange High School, whose co-founder served as the first president of the South African Native National Congress. It was sung to close the Congress meeting in 1912, and by 1925 it had become the official closing anthem of the organisation, now known as the African National Congress. "Nkosi Sikelel' iAfrika" was first published in 1927. The song was the official anthem for the African National Congress during the apartheid era and was a symbol of the anti-apartheid movement. For decades during the apartheid regime it was considered by many to be the unofficial national anthem of South Africa, representing the suffering of the oppressed masses. Because of its connection to the ANC, the song was banned by the regime during the apartheid era.

Use today

South Africa 

In 1994, after the end of apartheid, the new President of South Africa Nelson Mandela declared that both "Nkosi Sikelel' iAfrika" and the previous national anthem, "Die Stem van Suid-Afrika" would be national anthems. While the inclusion of "Nkosi Sikelel' iAfrika" celebrated the newfound freedom of most South Africans, the fact that "Die Stem" was also retained even after the fall of apartheid, represented the desire of the new government led by Mandela to respect all races and cultures in an all-inclusive new era dawning upon South Africa. During this period, the custom was to play "Die Stem" together with "Nkosi Sikelel' iAfrika" during occasions that required the playing of a national anthem.

In 1996, a shortened, combined version of the two compositions was released as the new national anthem of South Africa under the constitution of South Africa and was adopted the following year. This version uses several of the official languages of South Africa. The first two lines of the first stanza are sung in Xhosa and the last two in Zulu. The second stanza is sung in Sesotho. The third stanza consists of a verbatim section of the former South African national anthem, "Die Stem van Suid-Afrika", and is sung in Afrikaans. The fourth and final stanza, sung in English, is a modified version of the closing lines of "Die Stem van Suid-Afrika".

The South African National Anthem is often incorrectly called “Nkosi Sikelel’ iAfrika” but the correct name is “The National Anthem of South Africa”.

Tanzania 

A Swahili translation of "Nkosi Sikelel' iAfrika" with partially modified lyrics is used as the national anthem of Tanzania under the name of "Mungu ibariki Afrika" since 1961.

Melody only

Zambia 

"Nkosi Sikelel' iAfrika" was the national anthem of Zambia from independence in 1964 until 1973, when the melody was retained but the lyrics replaced by "Stand and Sing of Zambia, Proud and Free".

Former

Zimbabwe 

"Ishe Komborera Africa" was the Zimbabwean version of "God Bless Africa" sung in the Shona and Ndebele languages and was its first national anthem, adopted upon independence in 1980.

It was replaced in 1994 by "Ngaikomborerwe Nyika yeZimbabwe/Kalibusiswe Ilizwe LeZimbabwe", but "Ishe Komborera Africa" still remains very popular in the country.

Namibia 

"Nkosi Sikelel' iAfrika" was used provisionally as the national anthem of Namibia at time of the country's independence in March 1990. But soon after, an official contest was organised for a new national anthem. It was won by Axali Doeseb, who wrote "Namibia, Land of the Brave" which was officially adopted on the first anniversary of the country's independence, in 1991.

Other countries and organisations 

In other African countries throughout southern Africa, the song was sung by various independence and other movements. It includes versions in Chichewa (Malawi and Zambia). Outside of Africa, the hymn is perhaps best known as the long-time (since 1925) anthem of the African National Congress (ANC), as a result of the global anti-Apartheid Movement of the 1970s and 1980s, when it was regularly sung at meetings and other events.

In Finland the same melody is used as the children's psalm "". The hymn has appeared in Virsikirja, the hymnbook of the Evangelical Lutheran Church of Finland, with lyrics by Jaakko Löytty.

Lyrics

Historic lyrics 

The words of the first stanza and chorus were originally written in Xhosa as a hymn. In 1927 seven additional Xhosa stanzas were added by the poet Samuel Mqhayi.

Contemporary

Meaning and symbolism 

British musicologist Nicholas Cook states:
"Nkosi Sikelel' iAfrika" has a meaning that emerges from the act of performing it. Like all choral performance, from singing a hymn to chanting at a football match, it involves communal participation and interaction. Everybody has to listen to everyone else and move forward together. It doesn't just symbolize unity, it enacts it ... Through its block-like harmonic construction and regular phrasing, "Nkosi Sikelel' iAfrika" creates a sense of stability and mutual dependence, with no one vocal part predominating over the others ... It lies audibly at the interface between European traditions of 'common-practice' harmony and African traditions of communal singing, which gives it an inclusive quality entirely appropriate to the aspirations of the new South Africa ... Enlisting music's ability to shape personal identity, "Nkosi Sikelel' iAfrika" actively contributes to the construction of the community that is the new South Africa. In this sense, singing it is a political act.

Recordings 

Solomon Plaatje, author and founding member of the ANC, was the first to have the song recorded in London, 1923. A Sotho version was published in 1942 by Moses Mphahlele. Rev. John Langalibalele Dube's Ohlange Zulu Choir popularised the hymn at concerts in Johannesburg, and it became a popular church hymn that was also adopted as the anthem at political meetings.

A version by the London Symphony Orchestra under André Previn was featured in the film Cry Freedom (1987).

In Kenya, Mang'u High School uses a translation, Mungu Ibariki Mang'u High, as its school anthem.

It has also been recorded by Paul Simon and Miriam Makeba, Ladysmith Black Mambazo, Boom Shaka, Osibisa, Oliver Mtukudzi (the Shona version that was once the anthem of Zimbabwe) and the Mahotella Queens. Boom Shaka, a prominent South African kwaito group, formed the anthem in kwaito style, a popular South African genre influenced by house music. The interpretation was controversial, and it was viewed by some as a commercial subversion of the anthem; Boom Shaka countered by stating that their version represents liberation and introduces the song to younger listeners.

South African Idols-winner Elvis Blue recorded an Afrikaans translation of the song with Afrikaans singer Coenie de Villiers entitled "Seëngebed" ("Lord's Blessing") on his third studio album Afrikaans.

British a cappella vocal ensemble The King's Singers released a recording of the song, arranged by Neo Muyanga, on their album Finding Harmony.

See also 

 "Die Stem van Suid-Afrika", former national anthem of South Africa, used during the Apartheid era
 "Ishe Komborera Africa", former national anthem of Zimbabwe, used during the early 1980s
 "Shosholoza", Southern African folk song, often referred to as an unofficial national anthem of South Africa

References

External links 

 
 "Nkosi Sikelel' iAfrika" lyrics at the African National Congress (ANC)
 Thomasmesse Iserlohn (#18: "Nkosi sikelel' i Afrika", mp3 sung by a German church choir)
 History of "Nkosi Sikelel' iAfrika"
 BBC Rhythms of the Continent: "Nkosi Sikelel' iAfrika" in kwaito style

Songs about Africa
African anthems
Historical national anthems
National symbols of South Africa
Southern Africa
South African songs
Miriam Makeba songs
National symbols of Tanzania
National symbols of Zimbabwe
National symbols of Namibia
Pan-Africanism in Africa
1897 songs
Xhosa culture
Anti-apartheid songs
National anthem compositions in G major
Anthems of organizations
Articles containing video clips